X51 or X-51 may refer to:

 Boeing X-51, a scramjet-waverider from the Air Force Research Laboratory
 X-51 (Deus Ex), a fictional organization in the video game Deus Ex
 X-51 (Machine Man), a fictional character in the Marvel Comics Universe
 X51 (New York City bus), express bus route in New York City
 Axim X51, PDA made by Dell
 X51 FAA LID for Homestead General Aviation Airport in Florida